Stony Mountain is a small community in Manitoba, Canada approximately  north of Winnipeg on Provincial Highway 7. The town is in the Rural Municipality of Rockwood and is the location of Stony Mountain Ski Area. The Stony Mountain Institution and Rockwood Institution prisons are in Stony Mountain.

It is the birthplace of hockey hall of famer Babe Pratt.

Demographics 

Water 
Water services to Stony Mountain are provided by the Cartier Regional Water Co-Op.

Climate

See also 
 List of communities in Manitoba

References

Unincorporated communities in Manitoba